Nathan Ryan Dahm (born January 27, 1983) is an American politician who has served as the Oklahoma State Senator for the 33rd district since 2012. Prior to holding office, Dahm worked as a missionary in Romania and was a Tulsa County Tea Party activist. Dahm has thrice sought federal office: first running for Oklahoma's 1st congressional district in 2010, then running for Oklahoma's 1st congressional district again in 2018, and then running for retiring Senator Jim Inhofe's United States Senate seat in 2022. He is term-limited in 2024.

Early life and political activism

Dahm was born in Broken Arrow, Oklahoma on January 27, 1983. 
In 1994, his family moved to Romania as missionaries motivated by a desire to proselytize in a former communist country.
Dahm graduated from Abeka Christian Academy Home School in 2001. After graduation, Dahm moved back to Romania to continue working as a missionary and later became dean of the Biblical school affiliated with his mission. He served as dean from 2003 to 2007. He is fluent in Romanian.

After returning to Oklahoma, Dahm was active in the Tulsa County Republican Party. 
In 2008, Dahm filed to run for Oklahoma House of Representatives district 75, but was later struck from the ballot. In 2010, he spoke at Tea Party rallies in Tulsa while campaigning for Oklahoma's 1st congressional district against incumbent John Sullivan. During the campaign, Dahm supported abolishing the Department of Education. Dahm placed 3rd in the six candidate primary, with Sullivan garnering a majority vote and avoiding a runoff.
The same year, he served as the vice-chair of the Tulsa County Alliance of Young Republicans and helped organize anti-abortion rallies in Tulsa.
On February 8, 2011, Dahm filed to run for Broken Arrow City Council. He withdrew his candidacy three days later.

Oklahoma Senate
Nathan Dahm served in the 54th Oklahoma Legislature, 55th Oklahoma Legislature, 56th Oklahoma Legislature, 57th Oklahoma Legislature, and the 58th Oklahoma Legislature.

Election and first term
After the 2010 census, Oklahoma Senate district 33 was redistricted from Midtown Tulsa to Broken Arrow, creating an open seat. In 2012, the first election after redistricting, Dahm filed to run in the new Oklahoma Senate district 33.
Four Republican candidates - Nathan Dahm, Cliff Johns, Don P. Little, and Tim Wright - filed for the office. Tim Wright led with 38% of the vote in the primary over Dahm's 36%, but both advanced to the runoff. Dahm won the runoff and the seat since no other party contested the race. No Republican had won election in Senate district 33 since 1923.

During the first session of the 54th Oklahoma Legislature in 2013, Dahm introduced numerous gun bills, including a bill penalizing the enforcement of federal government gun restrictions in Oklahoma 
Dahm also introduced legislation in the Senate to penalize the enforcement of and nullify the Patient Protection and Affordable Care Act in Oklahoma.

In the second session of the 54th Oklahoma Legislature in 2014, Dahm introduced the "Piers Morgan Constitutional Right to Keep and Bear Arms Without Infringement Act" which would allow firearms to be openly carried without a permit. Talk show host Piers Morgan invited him onto Piers Morgan Live to debate the legislation.

Dahm sponsored legislation in the Oklahoma Senate that would subject physicians performing abortions to felony charges and revocation of their medical licenses. It passed the Senate, 33–12, on May 19, 2016. The bill was vetoed by Republican Governor Mary Fallin.

Second term
In 2017, Dahm was rated the most conservative senator in the Legislature of Oklahoma by the Oklahoma Constitution, a conservative quarterly newspaper, and named “senate legislator of the year” by the Oklahoma Conservative Political Action Committee, a conservative think tank based in Oklahoma City.

Third term
In 2022, Senator Dahm sponsored Senate Bill 1166, which if passed would have prevented individuals charged for participation in the 2021 United States Capitol attack from being transported into or through Oklahoma.

Dahm is an opponent of sanctuary city policies. He has sponsored legislation to ban sanctuary cities in Oklahoma twice. Once in 2020 and another time in 2021.

Dahm has filed senate resolution 47, which could officially recognize June 14, as "President Donald Trump day". June 14 is Trump's birthday. The bill never received a floor vote.

In 2023, Dahm filed a bill to declare a state of emergency and prohibit any medical entity that provides gender affirming healthcare from receiving any federal, state, or municipal funding whatsoever, even if the funding is not for said care. Dahm was reported as stating that this was to "end the practice of gender destruction in our state". He filed a resolution to prevent 100 Ukrainian troops from training in Oklahoma, saying locals could be killed by errant rockets, and that the Ukrainian troops' presence would bring "unaccountable spending, corruption, and potential money laundering." The resolution was condemned by the U.S. Senate Republicans. Later he filed a bill to host peace talks for the conflict in Oklahoma.

2018 congressional election 

On May 5, 2017, Dahm announced his candidacy for Representative of Oklahoma's 1st congressional district. On June 28, 2018, he lost the Republican Primary for the seat by garnering 20.2% of the vote. Dahm missed advancing to the run-off by 2%.

2022 Senate election 

On September 28, 2021, Dahm announced his candidacy for the 2022 United States Senate election in Oklahoma, challenging incumbent Republican senator James Lankford. On February 28, 2022, Dahm announced he would instead run in the concurrent special election for Jim Inhofe's open Senate seat, upon news of his resignation. He placed third in the primary, as Markwayne Mullin and T. W. Shannon advanced to a runoff election.

Electoral history

Nathan Dahm was unopposed in the 2012 general election since no other party or independent filed for the race.

Nathan Dahm was unopposed for reelection in the 2020 Republican primary and general election.

See also
Oklahoma Republican Party

References

1983 births
21st-century American politicians
American anti-abortion activists
American gun rights activists
American Christian missionaries
Businesspeople from Oklahoma
Candidates in the 2010 United States elections
Candidates in the 2018 United States elections
Candidates in the 2022 United States Senate elections
Living people
Republican Party Oklahoma state senators
People from Broken Arrow, Oklahoma
Tea Party movement activists